Rashad F. Aslanov is an Azerbaijani diplomat serving as Ambassador Extraordinary and Plenipotentiary to Argentina, Chile, Paraguay, Uruguay and Bolivia.

References 

Azerbaijani diplomats